Den långsamma blomman is the debut studio album from Swedish pop singer Shirley Clamp, released on 26 May 2004. It peaked at number three on the Swedish Albums Chart.

Track listing
 "För den som älskar"
 "Min kärlek"
 "Eviga längtan"
 "Ingenting finns kvar"
 "Den långsamma blomman"
 "Det är så enkelt"
 "Dårarnas natt"
 "Ber en liten bön"
 "Jag fick låna en ängel"
 "Äntligen (Mr. Memory)"
 "Vågar inte än"
 "Det är du"
 "Champions" (Sweden women's national football team official song 2004)
 "Du är allt"

Charts

Weekly charts

Year-end charts

References

2004 debut albums
Shirley Clamp albums
Swedish-language albums